Medinipur Sadar subdivision is an administrative subdivision of the Paschim Medinipur district in the state of West Bengal, India.

Subdivisions
Paschim Medinipur district is divided into the following administrative subdivisions, after separation of Jhargram subdivision from the district in 2017:

Medinipur Sadar subdivision has a density of population of 588 per km2. 30.05% of the total population of the district resides in this subdivision.

Administrative units
Medinipur Sadar subdivision has 6 police stations, 6 community development blocks, 6 panchayat samitis, 64 gram panchayats, 2,370 mouzas, 1971 inhabited villages, 1 municipality and 5 census towns. The single municipality is at Midnapore. The census towns are: Garbeta, Amlagora, Durllabhganj, Dwarigeria and Naba Kola. The subdivision has its headquarters at Midnapore.

Police stations
Police stations in Medinipur Sadar subdivision have the following features and jurisdiction:

Gram panchayats
The subdivision contains 64 gram panchayats under 6 community development blocks:

 Midnapore Sadar Block: Banpura, Monidaha, Pathra, Chandra, Panchkhuri–I, Shiromoni, Dherua, Panchkhuri–II and Tantigeria.
 Garhbeta I Block: Agra, Baramura, Garanga, Kharkusma, Amkopa, Benachapra, Garhbeta, Sandhipur, Amlagora, Dhadika, Katra Uttarbil and Shyamnagar.
 Garhbeta II Block: Amlasuli, Jeerapara, Patharpara, Sarboth, Goaltore, Jogardanga, Pingboni, Gohaldanga, Makli and Piasala.
 Garhbeta III Block: Amsole, Nalbona, Raskunda, Shankarkanta, Karsa, Nayabasat, Satbankura and Uriasai.
 Keshpur Block: Amanpur, Enayetpur, Kalagram, Sarisha Khola, Amrakuchi, Golar, Jhentla, Shirsha, Anandapur, Jagannathpur, Keshpur, Teghari, Dhalhara, Jorakeudi Solidiha and Mugbasan.
 Salboni Block: Bankibandh, Debgram, Kashijora, Shatpati, Bhimpur, Garhmal, Lalgeria, Bishnupur, Karnagarh and Salboni.

Blocks
Community development blocks in Medinipur subdivision are:

Education
Paschim Medinipur district had a literacy rate of 78.00%  as per the provisional figures of the census of India 2011. Medinipur Sadar subdivision had a literacy rate of 77% Kharagpur subdivision 80.51% and Ghatal subdivision 82.55%.

Given in the table below (data in numbers) is a subdivision-wise comprehensive picture of the education scenario in Paschim Medinipur district, after separation of Jhargram subdivision, for the year 2013-14.

Note: Primary schools include junior basic schools; middle schools, high schools and higher secondary schools include madrasahs; technical schools include junior technical schools, junior government polytechnics, industrial technical institutes, industrial training centres, nursing training institutes etc.; technical and professional colleges include engineering colleges, medical colleges, para-medical institutes, management colleges, teachers training and nursing training colleges, law colleges, art colleges, music colleges etc. Special and non-formal education centres include sishu siksha kendras, madhyamik siksha kendras, adult high schools, centres of Rabindra mukta vidyalaya, recognised Sanskrit tols, institutions for the blind and other handicapped persons, Anganwadi centres, reformatory schools etc.

The following institutions are located in Medinipur Sadar subdivision:

Vidyasagar University at Midnapore was established in 1981 as an affiliating university.
Midnapore Medical College and Hospital at Midnapore was established in 2004.
Midnapore College at Midnapore was established in 1873. It was granted autonomous status in 2014-15. It offers under-graduate and post-graduate courses
Midnapore Law College at Midnapore was established in 2002. It offers 5-years course in BA LLB (Hons) and 3-years course in LLB.
K.D. College of Commerce and General Studies at Midnapore was established in 1961.
Raja Narendra Lal Khan Women's College at Midnapore was established in 1957.
Salboni Government College was established at Salboni in 2011.
Sukumar Sengupta Mahavidyalaya at Keshpur was established in 2004.
Garhbeta College was established at Garbeta in 1948.
Santal Bidroha Sardha Satabarsiki Mahavidyalaya at Goaltore was established in 2005.
Gourav Guin Memorial College was established at Chandrakona Road, PO Satbankura in 2008.

Healthcare
The table below (all data in numbers) presents an overview of the subdivision-wise medical facilities available and patients treated, after the separation of Jhargram, in the hospitals, health centres and sub-centres in 2014 in Paschim Medinipur district.
 

Excluding nursing homes

Medical facilities
Medical facilities in the Medinipur Sadar subdivision are as follows:

Hospitals: (Name, location, beds)

Rural government hospitals: (Name, CD block, location, beds) 

Salboni Rural Hospital, Salboni CD block, Salboni, 35 beds
Keshpur Rural Hospital, Keshpur CD block, Keshpur, 30 beds
Garbeta Rural Hospital, Garhbeta I CD block, Garbeta, 60 beds
Kewakole Rural Hospital, Garhbeta II CD block, Goaltore, 30 beds
Dwarigeria Rural Hospita, Garhbeta III CD block, Dwarigeria, 30 beds

Block primary health centres: (Name, CD block, location, beds)
Chandra (Deypara) Block Primary Health Centre, Midnapore Sadar CD block, Chandra, 15 beds

Primary health centres : (CD block-wise) (CD block, PHC location, beds)
Midnapore Sadar CD block: Panchkuri (10), Pathra (6)
Salboni CD block: Godapaisal (10), Bhimpur (6), Pirakata (4)
Keshpur CD block: Dhalhara (PO Pursura) (6), Mahaboni (PO Mohabani) (10), Anandapur (6)
Garhbeta I CD block: Sandhipur (10), Parbatipur (PO Kharkusma)(6), Nohari (4)
Garhbeta II CD block: Charubala (PO Bulanpur) (4), Babuidanga (PO Amlasuli) (10)
Garhbeta III CD block: Chottotara (PO Guiadaha) (10), Nayabasat (4)

Private hospitals 

Annapurna Nursing Home	Vill + PO : Panchberia, PS - Daspur, Panchberia, Pin - 721146
Arogya Seva Sadan Vill+PO : Krishnagar, PS: KGP Dist. Paschim Midnapore Pin - 721143
Arogya Seva Sadan Vill+PO-Krishnanagar, PS- Kharagpur, West Midnapore, W.B.-721149
Disha Nursing Home Kushpata, Ghatal, West Midnapore, W.B.-721212
Divine Health Point Vill+PO- Madpur, PS- Kharagpur Local, West Midnapore, W.B.-721149
Gandhi Mission trust L.C. Dani Eye Hospital - Daspur Dihibaliharpur, Daspur, West Midnapore, W.B.-721211
Ganga Nursing Home - Balichak	Vill- Golui, PO - Balichak, PS - Debra, Paschim Midnapore - 721124
Paschim Medinipur Jeevan Deep Nursing Home AT - Kushpata, PO + PS - Ghatal Pin - 721212
K.G. Medicare (Multi Speciality Hospital) Hospital Road (Harishan Dighi Market Complex) Battalachowk Midnapore - 721101
Life Care Nursing Home	Prembazar, 25, Vivekananda Road High Coop. Kharagpur 721306
Life Line Nursing Home	Vill+PO+PS- Gobindapur, West Midnapore, W.B.-721146	Nemai 
Maa-Kali Nursing Home	Vill+PO- Panchberia, West Midnapore
Mahamaya Nursing Home - Midnapore town	Keranitala, PO- Midnapore PS- Kotwali, West Midnapore, W.B.-721101
Matri Asish Nursing Home - Sultanpur-KGP - II	Vill- Sultanpur, PO- Hat Sultanpur, West Midnapore, W.B.-721149
Midnapur Eye Bank & Eye Care Unit Prembazar, Kharagpur, West Midnapore, W.B.-721306	Hospital
Midnapur Rotary Eye Hospital	B-3, Burdge Town, PS- West Midnapore, W.B.-721101
Moonlight Nursing Home - Ghatal	Kushpata, Ghatal, West Midnapore, W.B.-721212
Mother Nursing Home	Gobindanagar, Goura, West Midnapore, W.B.-721146
New Ashirbad Nursing Home	Vill- Bagda, PO+PS- Mohanpur, West Midnapore, W.B.
New Karmakar Nursing Home Dakshin Bazar, Chandrakona, Paschim Midnapore - WB - 721201
New Life Nursing Home	Kushpata, Ghatal, West Midnapore, W.B.-721212
New Srima Nursing Home	Vill + PO Goura, PS Daspur Dist. Paschim Midnapore
Rai Nursing Home Vill- Kalyanpur, PO- Arjuni, PS- Debra, NH-6, West Midnapore, W.B.-721126
Ramkrishna Seva Sadan	Vill- Baragarh, PO- Debra Bazar, PS- Debra, West Midnapore, W.B.-721146
Sabita Nursing Home - Ghatal	Kushpata, Ghatal, West Midnapore, W.B.-721212
Salua Nursing Home	Salua Kharagpur Kharagpur 721145 Dist Midnapore West Bengal
Shivananda Nayanalok Eye Hospital	Math Bishmupur, PS- Debra, West Midnapore, W.B.-721136
Shree Maa Nursing Home	Vill. Debra Bazar, Paschim Medinipore Paschim Medinipore 721126
Spandan Diagnostic Centre Rabindranagar Midnapore Midnapore 721101 Dist Midnapore West Bengal
Sri Durga Nursing Home	Vill- Baragarh, PO- Debra Bazar, PS- Debra, West Midnapore, W.B.-721146
Sristi Nursing Home - Ghatal	Vill: Konnagar, PO+PS- Ghatal, West Midnapore, W.B.-721212
St.Josephs Hospital (Seva Kendra Calcutta)	Phulpahari, Vidyasagar University Vidyasagar University Pachim Midnapore 721102
Tara Ma Nursing Home	560, Math Bishnupur,
Taramahal Nursing Home	Vill + PO + PS : Keshpur, Dist - Paschim Midnapore, Pin 721150

Electoral constituencies
Lok Sabha (parliamentary) and Vidhan Sabha (state assembly) constituencies in Paschim Medinipur district were as follows from 2006:

References

Subdivisions of West Bengal
Subdivisions in Paschim Medinipur district
Paschim Medinipur district